Lerista anyara, the Olkola slider skink , is a species of skink found in  Queensland in Australia.

References

Lerista
Reptiles described in 2019
Taxa named by Andrew P. Amey
Taxa named by Patrick J. Couper
Taxa named by Jessica Worthington Wilmer